Lynette Alice "Squeaky" Fromme (born October 22, 1948) is an American criminal who was a member of the Manson family, a cult led by Charles Manson. Though not involved in the Tate–LaBianca murders for which the Manson family is best known, she attempted to assassinate President Gerald Ford in 1975. For that crime, she was sentenced to life in prison. She was paroled from prison on August 14, 2009, after serving approximately 34 years. She published a book about her life in 2018.

Early life
Fromme was born on October 22, 1948, in Santa Monica, California, the daughter of Helen (née Benzinger) and William Millar Fromme, an aeronautical engineer. As a child, Fromme performed with a popular dance group called the Westchester Lariats, which began touring the United States and Europe in the late 1950s, and had an appearance on The Lawrence Welk Show and at the White House.

In 1963, the family moved to Redondo Beach, and Fromme began using alcohol and drugs. Her grades dropped at Redondo Union High School, but she graduated in 1966. She moved out of her parents' house for a few months before her father convinced her to enroll at El Camino College. She returned home for two months before her father kicked her out following an argument, rendering her homeless.

Charles Manson and Manson Family involvement
In 1967, at the age of 19, Fromme dropped out of college and went to Venice Beach after her parents had thrown her out of the house. Suffering from depression, she sat on a curb and watched a bus arrive, and Charles Manson exited. Manson stopped and looked at her and said "Your parents threw you out, didn't they?" Fromme immediately decided Manson was a psychic. Manson walked away and Fromme picked up her belongings and followed him. Manson had recently been released from the federal prison at Terminal Island, and Fromme became the second member of what would become the Manson Family.

Fromme found Manson's philosophies and attitudes appealing, and the two became friends and traveled together with other young people, including Mary Brunner and Susan Atkins. She lived with the Manson Family at Spahn Ranch where they worked for their keep, and at the Barker Ranch in Death Valley, which was owned by a Family member's grandmother. Ranch owner George Spahn gave her the nickname "Squeaky" because of the sound that she made when he touched her.

Manson and some of his followers were arrested for the Sharon Tate and Leno and Rosemary LaBianca murders in 1969, and Fromme and the remaining Manson Family camped outside the trial. Manson and fellow defendants Atkins, Patricia Krenwinkel, and Leslie Van Houten carved Xs into their foreheads, as did Fromme and her compatriots. They proclaimed Manson's innocence and preached his apocalyptic philosophy to the news media and to anyone else who would listen. Fromme was not charged with involvement in the murders, but was convicted of attempting to prevent Manson's imprisoned followers from testifying, as well as contempt of court when she refused to testify herself. She was given short jail sentences for both offenses.

Fromme and Sandra Good moved into an older attic apartment in downtown Sacramento, as they wanted to be near Manson after he was moved to Folsom Prison. She and Good lived in the third-floor apartment at 1725 P Street in Sacramento.()

Around 1973, Fromme started work on an extensive 600-page book about the Manson Family, including intricate drawings and photos; other family members had contributed to it as well. Fromme sent it to publishers, but she dropped it after discussing it with Clem Grogan, deciding that the project was too incriminating. The book, titled Reflexion, was eventually published in 2018 by the Peasenhall Press.

Murder in Stockton, California
Fromme traveled to Stockton in 1972 with Nancy Pitman, Priscilla Cooper, and Aryan Brotherhood members Michael Monfort and James Craig, in order to follow through with Manson's deal with the Brotherhood. This group met James and Lauren Willett at a cabin. In November 1972, Montfort and Craig forced James Willett to dig his own grave and then shot him because he was going to tell the authorities about a series of robberies that they had committed after they were released from prison. His body was found with his hand still sticking out of the ground. The housemates were arrested on suspicion of murder, after which Lauren's body was discovered in the basement. She had been shot to death. The Willetts' eight-month-old daughter, Heidi, was found alive in the house. Fromme was released for lack of evidence.

The Sonoma County coroner's office concluded that James Willett was killed sometime in September 1972, although his decapitated body was not found until the beginning of November. He had been buried near Guerneville. On the night of November 11, 1972, the Stockton Police responded to information that a station wagon owned by the Willetts was parked in front of 720 W. Flora St. Sergeant Richard Whiteman forced his way into the house: "All the persons subsequently arrested were in the house except for Fromme. She telephoned the house while police were there, asking to be picked up, and officers obliged, taking her into custody nearby. Police found a quantity of guns and ammunition in the house along with amounts of marijuana, and noticed freshly dug earth beneath the building."

Fromme later told reporters that she had been traveling in California trying to visit "brothers" in jail and to visit Manson. She said that she came to Stockton on November 10 to visit William Goucher, who was in jail on a robbery charge, when Lauren died. When Fromme left the jail after visiting Goucher, she called the house on Flora Street to have someone pick her up, and the Stockton Police traced the call and arrested her at a phone booth.

The Stockton Police exhumed the body of Lauren Willett the following day. Cooper told investigators that she had been shot accidentally, contending that Monfort was "demonstrating the dangers of firearms, playing a form of Russian roulette with a .38 caliber pistol" and had first spun the gun cylinder and shot at his own head, and then pointed it at the victim, when it fired. The police determined that Lauren had been with them voluntarily. Fromme was held in custody for 2½ months but never charged; she said she was innocent of any wrongdoing. The other four people involved were convicted.

After leaving Stockton, Fromme moved into a Sacramento apartment with Sandra Good. The two wore robes on occasion and changed their names to symbolize their devotion to Manson's new religion, Fromme becoming "Red" in honor of her red hair and the California redwoods, and Good becoming "Blue" for her blue eyes and the ocean; both nicknames were originally given to them by Manson.

Attempt to contact Jimmy Page
Prior to a Led Zeppelin concert in Long Beach in 1975, Fromme knocked on the hotel door of Danny Goldberg, vice-president of the band's record label, Swan Song Records. Fromme, described as frantic and with a nervous tic marring her face, asked to meet with Led Zeppelin guitarist Jimmy Page to warn him, claiming to have foreseen the future and wishing to warn Page of imminent "evil" which she believed might take place that night at the concert. Goldberg stated that she could not see Page until the following night, to which Fromme responded "tomorrow night will probably be too late". After a long discussion, Goldberg agreed to deliver a message to Page if she wrote it down. Fromme was subsequently escorted away against her will and the note was ultimately burned and never read. Goldberg later saw Fromme on the television news after she had attempted to assassinate President Gerald Ford.

Assassination attempt on President Ford

On the morning of September 5, 1975, Fromme went to Sacramento's Capitol Park, ostensibly to plead with President Gerald Ford about the plight of the California redwoods, dressed in a red robe and armed with a Colt M1911 .45-caliber semi-automatic pistol. The pistol's magazine was loaded with four rounds, but there was no round in the chamber. When Fromme pointed the gun at Ford she was immediately restrained by Secret Service agent Larry Buendorf. She managed to say a few sentences to the on-scene cameras while being handcuffed, emphasizing that the gun "didn't go off". In 1980, Fromme told The Sacramento Bee that she had deliberately ejected the round from her weapon's chamber before leaving home that morning, and investigators later found a round on her bathroom floor.

Fromme refused to cooperate with her own defense during her trial. Despite claiming that "I was not determined to kill the guy", Fromme was eventually convicted of the attempted assassination of the president and received a life sentence under a 1965 law that made attempted presidential assassinations a federal crime. Attorney Dwayne Keyes recommended severe punishment because she was "full of hate and violence"; Fromme threw an apple at him, hitting him in the face and knocking off his glasses. She told the press that she "came to get life. Not just my life but clean air, healthy water, and respect for creatures and creation."

Aftermath
In 1979, Fromme was transferred out of Federal Correctional Institution, Dublin, for attacking fellow inmate Julienne Bušić with a hammer. On December 23, 1987, she escaped from Federal Prison Camp Alderson in West Virginia in an attempt to meet Manson. She was captured two days later and incarcerated at the Federal Medical Center, Carswell, in Fort Worth, Texas.

Fromme continued to profess total allegiance to Manson. Vincent Bugliosi wrote in Helter Skelter that she and Good were the only members of the Manson Family who had not renounced him. She once told an Associated Press reporter, "The curtain is going to come down on all of us, and if we don't turn everything over to Charlie immediately, it will be too late."

Fromme first became eligible for parole in 2005 and was entitled by federal law to a mandatory hearing after thirty years, but she could waive that hearing and apply for release at a later date. She waived her right to request a hearing and was required by federal law to complete a parole application before one could be considered and granted. She was granted parole in July 2008, but was not released because of the extra time added to her sentence for the 1987 prison escape. 

She was released on parole from Federal Medical Center, Carswell, on August 14, 2009, and moved to New York State, where she and her boyfriend Robert Valdner live in a house decorated with skulls. In a 2019 televised interview, Fromme said about Manson, "Was I in love with Charlie? Yeah, [...] I still am."

In popular culture
 Fromme is portrayed by Laraine Newman on Saturday Night Live, Season 1, Episode 3 (October 25, 1975), in a skit titled "Dangerous but Inept," in which she is interviewed on a talk show of that title by its host, Jane Curtin.
 Fromme is a character in Stephen Sondheim's Assassins (1990), a musical about nine people who attempted to assassinate a U.S. president.
 Fromme is played by Kayli Carter in the 2018 Mary Harron directed autobiographical drama film Charlie Says.
 Fromme is portrayed by Dakota Fanning in Quentin Tarantino's film Once Upon a Time in Hollywood (2019).

Books
Squeaky: the life and times of Lynette Alice Fromme, 1997, Jess Bravin, St Martin's Press
Reflexion: Lynette Fromme's Story of Her Life with Charles Manson 1967–1969, 2018

See also
Sara Jane Moore, also tried to assassinate Ford

References

External links 
Official website (ATWA)

1948 births
20th-century American criminals
American failed assassins
American people convicted of attempted murder
American prisoners sentenced to life imprisonment
Criminals from California
Escapees from United States federal government detention
Failed assassins of presidents of the United States
Fugitives
Gerald Ford
Living people
Manson Family
People from Oneida County, New York
People from Redondo Beach, California
People from Santa Monica, California
People paroled from life sentence
Prisoners sentenced to life imprisonment by the United States federal government